Le Mars  is the county seat of Plymouth County, Iowa, United States. It is located on the Floyd River northeast of Sioux City. The population was 10,571 at the time of the 2020 census. Le Mars is part of the Sioux City metropolitan area.

History

Le Mars is the home of Wells Enterprises, Inc., world's largest producer of ice cream novelties in one location and is the "Ice Cream Capital of the World".

Le Mars was platted in 1869, but no lots were sold until the Iowa Falls and Sioux City Railroad Company, a subsidiary of the Iowa Falls and Sioux City Railroad (later part of the Illinois Central Railroad), completed its trackage from Le Mars southwardly to Sioux City in 1870.

Railroad magnate John I. Blair hosted an excursion to the new town, which was then called St. Paul Junction because of its 1871 connection to St. Paul on the nascent Sioux City & St. Paul Railroad. Blair asked the women in the party to name the town, and they submitted an acronym based upon their first names' initials: Lucy Ford and Laura Walker, Ellen Cleghorn or Elizabeth  Underhill, Martha Weare and Mary Weare, Adeline Swain, Rebecca Smith and Sarah Reynolds. (Note that some letters represent more than one person.) There was some subsequent uncertainty about who the women of the acronym actually were. For example, the city's web page contains a somewhat different list.

In 1885, Frederick Brooke Close, a young Englishman who had passed up attending Cambridge University to live in Iowa, founded the Northwestern Polo League in Le Mars.

During the Great Depression in 1933, at a time when banks were foreclosing on many farmers, Le Mars caught the attention of the nation when "over five hundred farmers crowded the court room in Le Mars", according to an account by historian Arthur Schlesinger, Jr.  The farmers were there to demand that Judge Charles C. Bradley suspend foreclosure proceedings until recently passed laws could be considered.  Judge Bradley refused.  One farmer remarked that the court room wasn't his alone, that farmers had paid for it with their taxes.  The crowd rushed the judge, slapped him, and placed a rope around his neck and a hub cap on his head.  They did not, however lynch him.

President George W. Bush came to Le Mars on November 3, 2006, to campaign for Jim Nussle, then candidate for Iowa governor, as well as Rep. Steve King.  He spoke at Le Mars Community High School to a crowd of over 2500 people. Le Mars is a popular stop for presidential candidates as they make their way across caucus-famous Iowa, and has been visited by nearly every presidential candidate over the past several elections including Barack Obama, Hillary Clinton, Mitt Romney, John McCain, etc.

Wells Enterprises 
In 1925, Fred H. Wells Jr. and his sons had opened an ice cream manufacturing plant there.  However, the plant (and the Wells name) was purchased by Fairmount Ice Cream in 1928.  In 1935, Fred and his sons sought to begin selling ice cream again, but could no longer use their name.  They therefore sponsored a “Name That Ice Cream” contest in the Sioux City Journal.  The winner of the $25 prize suggested "Blue Bunny" because his son had enjoyed seeing blue bunnies in department store windows at Easter.

Dominating the skyline of present-day Le Mars is Wells' Blue Bunny Dairy's  plant with a 12-story tall refrigeration tower called the "South Ice Cream Plant" – so-named because it is on the south side of town.  As of 2005, the plant employed 1,000 and produces 75 million gallons of frozen treats, the milk coming mainly coming from three large Iowa dairy farms.  The size of this plant has led to speculation that the company is the world's largest family-owned and managed dairy processor and the world's largest manufacturer of ice cream in one location, with Le Mars claiming to be the "Ice Cream Capital of the World".

Wells is best known for its various sweet products, including Blue Bunny, Bomb Pop, Blue Ribbon, and Chilly Cow. To showcase its sweet treats, Le Mars has an ice cream parlor, which was remodeled in 2019, and includes an old fashioned ice cream serving station, museum displays, roof-top seating, and gift shop. The ice cream parlor in Le Mars is one of the largest tourist attractions in the state of Iowa. Le Mars hosts an annual celebration "Ice Cream Days" every year in late June which includes many activities such as ice cream socials, concerts, art exhibitions, parades, and more.

Geography
Le Mars is located at  (42.788799, −96.165944).

Climate

Demographics

Le Mars is a part of the Sioux City metropolitan area.

2010 census
As of the census of 2015, there were 9,436 people, 4,013 households, and 2,593 families residing in the city. The racial makeup of the city was 92.5% White, 0.5% African American, 0.3% Native American, 0.7% Asian, 2.9% from other races, and 1.3% from two or more races. Hispanic or Latino of any race were 5.4% of the population.

There were 4,013 households, of which 31.8% had children under the age of 18 living with them, 52.3% were married couples living together, 8.5% had a female householder with no husband present, 3.9% had a male householder with no wife present, and 35.4% were non-families. 30.6% of all households were made up of individuals, and 13.7% had someone living alone who was 65 years of age or older. The average household size was 2.39 and the average family size was 3.00.

The median age in the city was 39.2 years. 25.9% of residents were under the age of 18; 7.3% were between the ages of 18 and 24; 23.5% were from 25 to 44; 26.3% were from 45 to 64; and 16.8% were 65 years of age or older. The gender makeup of the city was 48.4% male and 51.6% female.

2000 census
As of the census of 2000, there were 9,237 people, 3,640 households, and 2,453 families residing in the city. The racial makeup of the city was 97.24% White, 0.45% African American, 0.16% Native American, 0.30% Asian, 0.09% Pacific Islander, 0.94% from other races, and 0.81% from two or more races. Hispanic or Latino of any race were 2.44% of the population.

There were 3,640 households, out of which 34.2% had children under the age of 18 living with them, 56.0% were married couples living together, 8.4% had a female householder with no husband present, and 32.6% were non-families. 28.7% of all households were made up of individuals, and 13.7% had someone living alone who was 65 years of age or older. The average household size was 2.46 and the average family size was 3.05.

Age spread: 27.2% under the age of 18, 8.3% from 18 to 24, 27.6% from 25 to 44, 20.3% from 45 to 64, and 16.6% who were 65 years of age or older. The median age was 37 years. For every 100 females, there were 92.3 males. For every 100 females age 18 and over, there were 87.8 males.

The median income for a household in the city was $38,892, and the median income for a family was $47,409. Males had a median income of $35,936 versus $21,757 for females. The per capita income for the city was $19,598. About 4.5% of families and 6.2% of the population were below the poverty line, including 7.0% of those under age 18 and 6.7% of those age 65 or over.

Education 
Le Mars is home to two educational institutions, one public and one private.

Le Mars Community School District 
Le Mars Community School District is the public school serving over 2,000 students grades PK–12. Le Mars Community, known locally as "Community", has a mascot of a bulldog. Le Mars was a member of the Lakes Conference until July 2019, when it switched to the Missouri River Conference.

Elementary 
 Clark Elementary School (K–5)
 Franklin Elementary School (K–5)
 Kluckhohn Elementary School (K–5)

Middle school 
 Le Mars Community Middle School (6–8)

High school 
 Le Mars Community High School (9–12)

Alternative education 
 Individualized Learning Center

Gehlen Catholic Schools 
Gehlen Catholic is a private school associated with the Roman Catholic Diocese of Sioux City serving over 350 students in grades PK–12. Gehlen Catholic's mascot is a jay. Gehlen Catholic is a member of the War Eagle Conference.

Elementary 

 Gehlen Catholic Elementary School

Middle School 

 Gehlen Catholic Middle School

High school 

 Gehlen Catholic High School

Westmar University 
Westmar University was a private four-year liberal arts college in Le Mars. It permanently closed on November 21, 1997.

Transportation

Airports 
Le Mars Municipal Airport is owned by the city of Le Mars and located two nautical miles (3.7 km) southwest of its central business district.

Major roads 

 U.S. Route 75 runs north–south through the city of Le Mars.
 Iowa State Highway 3 runs east–west through the city of Le Mars.
 Iowa State Highway 60 begins on the north edge of Le Mars and continues northeast to the Minnesota border.

Notable places 

 Archie's Waeside is a steakhouse restaurant known across the nation for its dry-aged beef steaks and impressive wine list. Archie's was named the 2nd best steak house in America by Rachel Ray Magazine. In 2015, Archie's Waeside was awarded the James Beard Foundation's 2015 America's Classics Awards. Archies has won many other awards from various culinary-focused organizations. 
 The Wells Visitor Center and Ice Cream Parlor is located in downtown Le Mars. It was remodeled inside and out in 2018–2019. It offers an old-fashioned serving station, seating, interactive displays, roof-top seating, party room, and gift shop. According to their website, "you can expect nothing less than a tasty, interactive experience—with lots of ice cream, of course!" The Wells Visitor Center and Ice Cream Parlor is one of the most popular tourist destinations in Iowa. 
 Bob's Drive Inn is a popular local restaurant serving classic taverns and hotdogs, among other iconic "drive in" items. Bob's Drive Inn has won many awards, including "Best Hot Dog in Iowa" by People's Magazine. Due to Bob's Drive Inn's success locally, another location was opened in Arnolds Park, Iowa, a popular summer destination on Lake Okoboji.
Plymouth County Courthouse
St. George's Episcopal Church
Tonsfeldt Round Barn, listed on the National Register of Historic Places
Westmar University A private four-year liberal arts college that permanently closed on November 21, 1997.
Wells Enterprises 
Le Mars Public Library
Plymouth Roller Milling Company

Notable people

 Clarence E. Coe, pioneer of Palms, California and member of the Los Angeles, California, City Council, born in Le Mars
 Bruce Dreckman, umpire in Major League Baseball
 Albert W. Durley, Wisconsin State Assemblyman and lawyer
Loyal M. Haynes, Brigadier General in U.S. Army, commanding general of 2nd Division Artillery Unit in Korean War and survivor of the 1946 C-53 Skytrooper crash on the Gauli Glacier
 John Gregory Kelly, Roman Catholic bishop
 Clyde Kluckhohn, Harvard professor in Social Anthropology, born in Le Mars
 Keith Knudsen, drummer for the Doobie Brothers
 Jim Nicholson, former Secretary of Veteran Affairs and Republican Party Chairman
 Donald Paulin, Iowa state legislator, mayor of Le Mars, and businessman
 Nancy Jo Powell, former United States ambassador
 Paul Rust, star of I Love You, Beth Cooper and Love (TV series)
 Roger C. Schultz, United States Army Lieutenant General and Director of the Army National Guard
 John Spenkelink, first person involuntarily executed in the United States after the re-introduction of the death penalty
 Charles A. Spring, influential Presbyterian, son of Revolutionary War chaplain Samuel Spring
 Thomas Starzl, innovator in organ transplant surgery
 Isaac S. Struble, congressman and namesake of Struble, Iowa

See also

Damnation (TV series)

References

External links

City of Le Mars
Blue Bunny Official Site
Westmar College Unofficial Site
City Data Comprehensive Statistical Data and more about Le Mars

 
Cities in Iowa
Cities in Plymouth County, Iowa
County seats in Iowa
Populated places established in 1869
1869 establishments in Iowa